Eleanor Calvert Custis Stuart (1757/1758 – September 28, 1811), born Eleanor Calvert, was a prominent member of the wealthy Calvert family of Maryland.  Upon her marriage to John Parke Custis, she became the daughter-in-law of Martha Dandridge Custis Washington and the stepdaughter-in-law of George Washington. Her portrait hangs today at Mount Airy Mansion in Rosaryville State Park, Maryland.

Early life
Eleanor Calvert was born in 1758 at the Calvert family's Mount Airy plantation near Upper Marlboro in Prince George's County, Maryland. Eleanor was the second-eldest daughter of Benedict Swingate Calvert, illegitimate son of Charles Calvert, 5th Baron Baltimore, and Benedict's wife Elizabeth Calvert Butler. She was known to her family as "Nelly." As a teenager, Eleanor was an exceptionally pretty girl and well-mannered.

Marriages and children

Eleanor married John Parke Custis, son of the late Daniel Parke Custis and Martha Dandridge Custis Washington (and stepson of George Washington), on February 3, 1774 at Mount Airy. When "Jacky", as he was known by his family, announced his engagement to Eleanor to his parents, they were greatly surprised due to the couple's youth.

After their marriage, the couple settled at the White House plantation, a Custis estate on the Pamunkey River in New Kent County, Virginia.  After the couple had lived at the White House for more than two years, John Custis purchased the Abingdon plantation in Fairfax County, Virginia (now in Arlington County, Virginia), into which the couple settled during the winter of 1778–1779.

Eleanor and John had seven children:
 unnamed daughter (1775 - 1775), died shortly after birth
 Elizabeth Parke Custis Law, "Eliza" (1776–1831), married Thomas Law
 Martha Parke Custis Peter, "Patsy" (1777–1854), married Thomas Peter
 Eleanor Parke Custis Lewis, "Nelly" (1779–1852), married Lawrence Lewis
 unnamed twin daughters (1780 - 1780), died three weeks after birth
 George Washington Parke Custis, "Wash" (1781–1857), married Mary Lee Fitzhugh

In 1781, John died of "camp fever", believed to be typhus, following the Siege of Yorktown. Eleanor's two elder daughters, Elizabeth and Martha, continued to live with her at the Abingdon plantation. She sent her two younger children, Eleanor and George, to Mount Vernon to live with their grandmother, Martha Washington, and her husband George Washington, future president. John died intestate, so his widow was granted a "dower third", the lifetime use of one-third of the Custis estate assets, including its more than 300 slaves. The balance of the Custis estate was held in trust for their children and distributed as the daughters married and the son reached his majority. Eleanor's "dower third" was distributed among their children following her death.

In 1783, Eleanor married Dr. David Stuart, an Alexandria physician and business associate of George Washington. Eleanor and David had sixteen children together:

 Ann Calvert Stuart (born 1784), married William Robinson
 Sarah Stuart (born 1786), married Obed Waite
 Ariana Calvert Stuart (born 1789), died unmarried
 William Sholto Stuart (born 1792), died unmarried
 Charles Calvert Stuart (1794–1846), married Cornelia Lee
 Eleanor Custis Stuart (born 1796), died unmarried
 Rosalie Eugenia Stuart (1801–1886), married William Greenleaf Webster
 Nine other children who were stillborn or died shortly after birth

Later life
In 1792, Eleanor, David and their family left Abingdon (which had become part of the District of Columbia) and moved to David's plantation and mill known as Hope Park in Fairfax County. About ten years later, they moved to Ossian Hall near Annandale, also in Fairfax County.

Eleanor died on September 28, 1811 at age 53 at Tudor Place, the home of her daughter, Martha Parke Custis Peter, in Georgetown, District of Columbia. She was originally buried at Col. William Alexander's Effingham Plantation in Prince William County, Virginia.

She was reinterred in Page's Chapel, St. Thomas' Church, Croom, Maryland, following the War of 1812 near the graves of her parents. Her resting place remained unmarked until a limestone grave slab was installed in the chapel floor in autumn 2008.

See also
List of people with the most children

References

 Torbert, Alice. Eleanor Calvert and Her Circle. New York: William-Frederick Press, 1950.

External links
Eleanor Calvert, Baltimore Museum of Art

1758 births
1811 deaths
American socialites
American people of English descent
Eleanor
Custis family of Virginia
People from Arlington County, Virginia
People from Fairfax County, Virginia
People from Prince George's County, Maryland
Washington family
18th-century American women
19th-century American women